This article covers the 2013 football season in Chile.

National tournaments

Primera División

Transicion Champion: Unión Española
Topscorer: Javier Elizondo
Apetura Champion: O'Higgins
Topscorer: Luciano Vázquez

Copa Chile

Transicion Champion: Universidad de Chile
Topscorer: Matías Donoso

National team results

The Chile national football team results and fixtures for 2013.

2014 World Cup qualifiers

Friendly matches

Record

Goal scorers

External links
The official Chilean Football Association web site

 
Seasons in Chilean football